William Robinson Boothby  (26 September 1829 – 12 July 1903) was Electoral Commissioner for South Australia, in charge of every parliamentary election from 1856 to 1903.

Boothby was the eldest son of South Australian Supreme Court Justice Benjamin Boothby. William was born at Nottingham, England, and emigrated to Australia with his parents during 1853

In 1854, he was appointed as Deputy-Sheriff and its electoral officer for the colony, and he was promoted to Sheriff during 1856

He prepared the clauses of the South Australian Act of 1856 that instituted voting by ballot and those of the Act of 1858 that provided for the placing of a cross against the name of the favoured candidate. He based his reform on ballots pre-printed with the candidates' names. In a manner similar to that still used widely today, the voter marked the form in secret and placed it in a sealed box. The ballots were collected and counted so that no one could be identified from their voting paper.

On 2 April 1856, South Australia enacted a law introducing the secret ballot, which had been adopted two weeks earlier in Victoria.

This was a significant change from the British practice, where elections were conducted "on the voices". Voters assembled at local election centres where they called out the name of their chosen candidate, and the choice was then entered on a register. That public process made the voter vulnerable to both bribery and intimidation, which caused wide concern.

Boothby's system was adopted for use in federal government elections in Australia. In the second half of the 19th century, the use of the secret ballot spread to the US and to Europe; in 1892, Grover Cleveland became the first US president elected by Boothby's system, universally referred to as 'the Australian ballot' for nearly a century.

In 1893, he was created CMG.

Boothby was the State Returning Officer for the first Australian House of Representatives election in 1901. The Federal seat of Boothby, established in 1903 in Adelaide, was named in his honour.

In his later years, he became Comptroller of Prison Labour and a senator of the University of Adelaide in South Australia.

He died in Adelaide.

See also
Benjamin Boothby, his father
Guy Boothby, his nephew

Sources 
 G. N. Hawker, 'Boothby, William Robinson (1829-1903)', Australian Dictionary of Biography, Volume 3, Melbourne University Press, 1969, pp 196–197.
 Constitution Act 1856 (SA), National Archives of Australia
 Castles, AC and Harris, MC, 'Lawmakers and Wayward Whigs', Wakefield Press, Adelaide, 1987.
 Jaensch, Dean (ed.), 'The Flinders History of South Australia: Political History', Wakefield Press, Adelaide, 1986.
 Keeley, Rod, 'The Secret Ballot', in Brian Crozer "If We're So Great, Why Aren't We Better? A Critical Look at Six Great South Australian Firsts", South Australia Old Parliament House Museum, Adelaide, 1986.

Further reading
 

1829 births
1903 deaths
History of South Australia
Australian Companions of the Order of St Michael and St George
English emigrants to Australia
19th-century Australian public servants